Avrodh: The Siege Within 2 is an Indian Hindi-language military drama espionage streaming television series which premiered on SonyLIV on 24 June 2022. It was directed by Raj Acharya, and stars Abir Chatterjee in the lead role. The series is a standalone sequel to Avrodh: The Siege Within. It is based on operations conducted by the Indian Army to stop terrorist attacks and spread of fake notes, eventually leading to the implementation of demonetisation. The series is a fictionalised retelling of the chapter, ‘Just tell me when to begin Sir’, from the book India’s Most Fearless 2, written by Shiv Aroor and Rahul Singh.

Plot summary 

Pradeep Bhattacharya is an Income Tax officer, as well as a Captain in the Indian Army. Conspirators in Pakistan try to cause terrorist attacks, activate separatist groups, and spread counterfeit currency in India. Pradeep, along with the help of his colleagues and the Indian government, stop the terrorist attacks. However, the fake notes have already spread on a large scale. So, the Prime Minister decides to demonetise notes of denomination ₹500 and ₹1000.

Cast 

 Abir Chatterjee as Captain Pradeep Bhattacharya
 Vijay Krishna as Captain Imtiaz
 Vikram Gokhale as Prime Minister, based on Narendra Modi
 Neeraj Kabi as National Security Advisor Shailesh Malviya
 Anant Mahadevan as a cabinet minister
 Rajesh Khattar as the General of the Pakistan Army
 Karan Thakur (actor) as Captain Farooq of the Pakistan Army
 Mohan Agashe as the Indian Army General
 Sanjay Suri as Ehsan Waziri, a businessman and the mastermind behind the plans
 Aahana Kumra as Waziri's spy in India
Source:

Production 
The web series is a fictionalised retelling of the chapter, ‘Just tell me when to begin Sir’, from the book India’s Most Fearless 2, written by Shiv Aroor and Rahul Singh. Directed by Raj Acharya and produced by Applause Entertainment in association with Juggernaut Productions, the story is written by Brijesh Jayrajan and Sudeep Nigam. It released on 24 June 2022. It is a standalone sequel to Avrodh: The Siege Within, which is based on the 2016 Uri terrorist attack and the subsequent surgical strikes.

Critical reception 

The Times of India said that the series makes for an intense watch with its thrilling action, and praised the cast. Hindustan Times commented that Avrodh: The Siege Within 2 "is a series that tries really hard to be gripping but is hurt by lack of subtlety and some questionable production values." India Today praised the cinematography and background score, but termed the plot as predictable. Scroll.in lauded the action, but felt that the plot did not offer anything different. Telegraph India commended Abir Chatterjee's performance, but criticised the lack of thrill and human element. Koimoi gave the film 2.5 stars out of 5, and commented, "Things do get interesting partly but that doesn't negate the questionable factors."

References

External links
 
Avrodh: The Siege Within 2 on Sony Liv

2020s Indian television miniseries
Hindi-language web series
Indian drama web series
2020 Indian television series debuts
2020 Indian television series endings
Indian television series
Indian action television series
Indian crime drama television series
Indian historical television series
Indian military television series
Indian period television series
Indian political television series
Indian thriller television series
Television series based on actual events
Cultural depictions of Narendra Modi
Cultural depictions of Indian men
Indian Armed Forces in fiction
Cultural depictions of prime ministers of India
Television shows set in Jammu and Kashmir
Television shows set in Pakistan
Television shows set in Delhi
Kashmir conflict in fiction
SonyLIV original films